Public sector organisations in New Zealand comprise the state sector organisations plus those of local government.

Within the state sector lies the state services, and within this lies the core public service.

Legally, the Legislative Branch non-public service departments (the Office of the Clerk of the House of Representatives and the Parliamentary Service), Executive Branch non-public service departments, and the public service departments are all part of "the Crown".

State sector

Offices of Parliament 
 Office of the Controller and Auditor-General (Tumuaki o te Mana Arotake)
 Audit New Zealand
 Office of the Ombudsmen (Nga Kaitiaki Mana Tangata)
 Office of the Parliamentary Commissioner for the Environment (Te Kaitiaki Taiao a Te Whare Pāremata Aotearoa)

State services departments

Public service departments
The public service in New Zealand technically consists solely of the departments listed below.
 Crown Law Office (Te Tari Ture o te Karauna)
 Department of Conservation (Te Papa Atawhai)
 Department of Corrections (Ara Poutama Aotearoa)
 Department of Internal Affairs (Te Tari Taiwhenua)
 Archives New Zealand (Te Rua Mahara o te Kāwanatanga)
 Births, Deaths and Marriages (Whānautanga, Matenga, Mārenatanga)
 Censorship Compliance Unit
 Local Government Commission (Mana Kāwanatanga ā Rohe)
 New Zealand Lottery Grants Board (Te Puna Tahua)
 National Library of New Zealand
 Office for the Community & Voluntary Sector
 New Zealand Passports Office (Nga Uruwhenua)
 New Zealand Citizenship Office (Te Raraunga)
 New Zealand Gazette Office (Te Kahiti o Aotearoa)
 Translation Service, The
 Department of the Prime Minister and Cabinet
 Cabinet Office
 National Assessments Bureau
 Honours Secretariat
 National Emergency Management Agency
 Education Review Office (Te Tari Arotake Matauranga)
 Government Communications Security Bureau
 National Cyber Security Centre
 Inland Revenue Department (Te Tari Taake)
 Land Information New Zealand (Toitu te whenua)
 Crown Property Management
 New Zealand Geospatial Office
 Overseas Investment Office
 Ministry for Culture and Heritage (Te Manatū Taonga)
 Ministry for Pacific Peoples
 Ministry for Primary Industries (Manatū Ahu Matua)
 Ministry for the Environment (Manatū Mō Te Taiao)
 Ministry for Women (Manatū Wāhine)
Ministry of Business, Innovation and Employment (Hīkina Whakatutuki)
Business.govt.nz
Companies Office, which also manages registers for motor-vehicle traders, financial-service providers, societies and trusts and personal-property securities.
Consumer Affairs, formerly the Ministry of Consumer Affairs
Electricity Authority (NZ)
Electrical Workers Registration Board
Immigration New Zealand (Te Ratonga Manene)
Intellectual Property Office of New Zealand
Insolvency and Trustee Service
Natural Hazards Research Platform (NHRP)
New Zealand Cycle Trail
New Zealand Petroleum & Minerals
New Zealand Space Agency
Occupational Safety and Health (Te Ratonga Oranga)
Pike River Recovery Agency
Radio Spectrum Management
Social Housing Unit
 Ministry of Defence (Manatu Kaupapa Waonga)
 Ministry of Education (Te Tāhuhu o te Mātauranga)
 Ministry of Foreign Affairs and Trade (Te Manatū Aorere)
New Zealand Agency for International Development – NZAID (Nga Hoe Tuputupu-mai-tawhiti)
 Ministry of Health (Manatū Hauora)
 Medsafe (New Zealand Medicines and Medical Devices Safety Authority)
 National Radiation Laboratory
 New Zealand Health Information Service
 National Health Committee
 HealthPAC
 Ministry of Housing and Urban Development
 Ministry of Justice (Tāhū o te Ture)
 Crime Prevention Unit
 Office of Treaty Settlements
 Te Puni KōkiriMinistry for Māori Development
 Ministry of Social Development (Te Manatu Whakahiato Ora)
 Ministry of Youth Development (Te Manatū Whakahiato Taiohi)
 Work and Income (Te Hiranga Tangata)
 Studylink (Hoto Akoranga)
 Heartland Services (Ngā Ratonga ki te Manawa o te Whenua)
 The Office for Senior Citizens
 The Office of the Families Commission
 Ministry of Transport (Te Manatū Waka)
 New Zealand Customs Service (Te Mana Arai o Aotearoa)
 New Zealand Security Intelligence Service
 Oranga TamarikiMinistry for Children
 Pike River Recovery Agency (Te Kāhui Whakamana Rua Tekau mā Iwa)
 Public Service Commission (Te Kawa Mataaho)
 Serious Fraud Office (Te Tari Hara Taware)
 Statistics New Zealand (Tatauranga Aotearoa)
 Māori Trust Office
 The Treasury (Te Tai Õhanga)
 New Zealand Debt Management
 New Zealand Export Credit

Departmental agencies
Cancer Control Agency
National Emergency Management Agency
Ministry for Ethnic Communities
replaces the Office of Ethnic Communities (previously Ethnic Affairs) that was part of Internal Affairs
Office for Māori Crown Relations–Te Arawhiti 
Social Wellbeing Agency
Whaikaha - Ministry of Disabled People

Interdepartmental executive boards
Border Executive Board
Family Violence Executive Board
Strategic Planning Reform Board

State services organisations outside the core public service 
 New Zealand Defence Force (NZDF) (Te Ope Kaatua O Aotearoa)
 New Zealand Cadet Forces
 Air Training Corps
 New Zealand Cadet Corps
 Sea Cadet Corps
 NZDF armed forces
 New Zealand Army (Ngāti Tumatauenga)
 Regular Force
 Territorial Force
 Army Reserve
 Royal New Zealand Navy (RNZN)
 Royal New Zealand Naval Reserve
 Royal New Zealand Naval Volunteer Reserve (RNZNVR)
 Royal New Zealand Air Force (RNZAF)
 Air Force Reserve
 Royal New Zealand Air Force (RNZAF)
 Territorial Air Force (TAF)
 Veterans' Affairs New Zealand (Te Tira Ahu Ika A Whiro) (semi-autonomous body)
 Office of the Clerk of the House of Representatives
 Reporting Services (Hansard)
 Parliamentary Counsel Office (New Zealand) (Te Tari Tohutohu Paremata)
 Parliamentary Service (includes the Parliamentary Library)
 Parliamentary Service Commission
 Visitor Services
 New Zealand Police (Ngā Pirihimana O Aotearoa)

Reserve Bank of New Zealand 
 Reserve Bank of New Zealand

Crown entities

Crown agents
 Accident Compensation Corporation (Te Kaporeihana Āwhina Hunga Whara)
 Callahan Innovation
 Civil Aviation Authority
 Earthquake Commission
 Education New Zealand
 Energy Efficiency and Conservation Authority
 Environmental Protection Authority
 Fire and Emergency New Zealand
 Health Quality and Safety Commission
 Health Research Council of New Zealand
 Kāinga Ora - Homes and Communities
 Maritime New Zealand
 New Zealand Antarctic Institute
 New Zealand Blood Service
 New Zealand Qualifications Authority
 New Zealand Tourism Board
 New Zealand Trade and Enterprise
 New Zealand Walking Access Commission
 Pharmaceutical Management Agency
 Real Estate Agents Authority
 Social Workers Registration Board
 Sport New Zealand
 Taumata Arowai - the Water Services Regulator
 Te Whatu Ora (Health New Zealand)
 Tertiary Education Commission
 Careers New Zealand
  Waka Kotahi – NZ Transport Agency
 WorkSafe New Zealand

Autonomous crown entities
 Accreditation Council
 Arts Council of New Zealand Toi Aotearoa
 Broadcasting Commission (New Zealand on Air) (Irirangi Te Motu)
 Government Superannuation Fund Authority
 Guardians of New Zealand Superannuation
 Heritage New Zealand (Pouhere Taonga)
 Museum of New Zealand Te Papa Tongarewa
 New Zealand Artificial Limb Board
 New Zealand Film Commission
 New Zealand Infrastructure Commission (Te Waihanga)
 New Zealand Lotteries Commission
 New Zealand Symphony Orchestra
 Public Trust
 Retirement Commission
 Te Māngai Pāho (Maori Broadcasting Funding Agency)
 Te Taura Whiri I Te Reo Māori (Māori Language Commission)

Independent crown entities
 Broadcasting Standards Authority
 Children's Commissioner
 Climate Change Commission
 Commerce Commission
 Criminal Cases Review Commission
 Drug Free Sport New Zealand
 Electoral Commission
 Electricity Authority (Te Komihana Hiko)
 External Reporting Board
 Financial Markets Authority
 Health and Disability Commissioner
 Human Rights Commission
 Independent Police Conduct Authority
 Law Commission
 Mental Health Commission
 Office of Film and Literature Classification
 Privacy Commissioner
 Productivity Commission
 Takeovers Panel
 Transport Accident Investigation Commission

Crown entity companies
 New Zealand Fast Forward Fund Limited
 New Zealand Venture Investment Fund Limited
 Radio New Zealand Limited
 Television New Zealand Limited (TVNZ)

Crown Research Institutes (CRIs) 

(with principal campuses)
 AgResearch (New Zealand Pastoral Agriculture Research Institute Limited) (Ruakura, Hamilton)
 ESR (Institute of Environmental Science and Research Limited) (Porirua)
 Forest Research (New Zealand Forest Research Institute Limited) (Rotorua)
 GNS Science (formerly Institute of Geological and Nuclear Sciences Limited) (Lower Hutt)
 IRL (Industrial Research Limited) Web page (Now part of Callaghan Innovation)
 Landcare Research (Landcare Research New Zealand Limited) (Lincoln)
 NIWA (National Institute of Water and Atmospheric Research Limited) (Auckland)
 Plant & Food Research (New Zealand Institute for Plant and Food Research Limited) (Auckland)
 Institute For Social Research and Development Limited (Wellington). Disestablished in 1995 after failing to achieve financial viability.

School boards of trustees 
See: Education in New Zealand

Tertiary education institutions 

State-owned tertiary institutions consist of universities, colleges of education (teachers colleges), polytechnics (institutes of technology) and wānanga. In addition there are numerous non-state-owned private training establishments.

Universities 
(and amalgamated colleges of education, with principal campus only)
 AUT University (Te Wananga Aronui o Tāmaki Makau Rau) (Auckland)
 Lincoln University (Te Whare Wanaka o Aoraki) (Lincoln)
 Massey University (Te Kunenga ki Purehuroa) (Palmerston North)
 Palmerston North College of Education
 University of Auckland (Waipapa Taumata Rau) (Auckland)
 Auckland College of Education (Te Kura Akoranga o Tamaki Makaurau)
 University of Canterbury (Te Whare Wānanga O Waitaha) (Christchurch)
 Christchurch College of Education (Te Whare Whai Mātauraka Ki Ōtautahi)
 University of Otago (Te Whare Wānanga o Otāgo) (Dunedin)
 University of Otago College of Education (Te Kura Akau Taitoka)
 University of Waikato (Te Whare Wānanga o Waikato) (Hamilton)
 Hamilton Teachers' Training College
 Victoria University of Wellington (Te Herenga Waka) (Wellington)
 Wellington College of Education (Te Whānau o Ako Pai ki te Upoko o te Ika)

Institutes of Technology and Polytechnics
(with principal campus only)
Crown entity subsidiaries of Te Pūkenga (the New Zealand Institute of Skills and Technology) (NZIST)
 Ara Institute of Canterbury Previously CPIT (ICS NZ) (Christchurch)
 Eastern Institute of Technology (EIT) (Taradale)
 Manukau Institute of Technology (MIT) (South Auckland)
 Nelson Marlborough Institute of Technology (NMIT) (Nelson)
 NorthTec, formerly Northland Polytechnic (Whangarei)
 Otago Polytechnic (Dunedin)
 The Open Polytechnic of New Zealand (Lower Hutt)
 Southern Institute of Technology (SIT) (Invercargill)
 Tai Poutini Polytechnic (Greymouth)
 Toi Ohomai Institute of Technology (Rotorua, Tauranga)
 Unitec Institute of Technology (Auckland)
 UCOL (Universal College of Learning) (Palmerston North)
 Waikato Institute of Technology (Wintec) (Hamilton)
 Wellington Institute of Technology (WelTec) (Lower Hutt)
 Western Institute of Technology at Taranaki (New Plymouth)
 Whitireia Community Polytechnic (WCP) (Porirua)

Wānanga 

(with principal campus only)

The following wānanga are those who have been granted Crown entity status; there are many that have not.
 Te Wānanga o Aotearoa (TWOA) (Te Awamutu)
 Te Wānanga-o-Raukawa (TWOR) (Ōtaki)
 Te Whare Wānanga o Awanuiārangi (Whakatāne)

Independent statutory entities 
 Te Aka Whai Ora (Māori Health Authority)
 Te Mātāwai

Public Finance Act Schedule 4 Organisations 
 Agricultural and Marketing Research and Development Trust
 Asia New Zealand Foundation
 Fish and Game Councils
 Auckland and Waikato
 Central South Island
 Eastern
 Hawke's Bay
 Nelson Marlborough
 North Canterbury
 Northland
 Otago
 Southland
 Taranaki
 Wellington
 West Coast
 Leadership Development Centre Trust
 Māori Trustee
 National Pacific Radio Trust
 New Zealand Fast Forward Limited
 New Zealand Fish and Game Council
 New Zealand Game Bird Habitat Trust Board
 New Zealand Government Property Corporation
 New Zealand Lottery Grants Board
 Ngāi Tahu Ancillary Claims Trust
 Pacific Co-operation Foundation
 Pacific Island Business Development Trust
 Research and Education Advanced Network New Zealand Limited
 Reserve Boards (24)
 Road Safety Trust
 Sentencing Council

State-owned enterprises 

The state enterprises are listed in Schedule 1 of the State-owned Enterprises Act.
 Airways Corporation of New Zealand Limited
 Animal Control Products Limited
 AsureQuality Limited
 Electricity Corporation of New Zealand Limited
 KiwiRail Holdings Limited
 Kordia (formerly BCL)
 Landcorp Farming Limited
 Learning Media Limited
 Meteorological Service of New Zealand Limited
 New Zealand Post Limited
 New Zealand Railways Corporation
 Quotable Value Ltd (QV)
 Transpower New Zealand Limited

Local government
Local government in New Zealand consists of city councils, district councils and regional councils. These are all also known as "local authorities". City councils and district councils are collectively known as territorial authorities.
Local authorities may set up various council-controlled organisations for specific purposes.

Regional councils

City and district councils

Historic organisations 
 New Zealand Broadcasting Corporation
 New Zealand Forest Service
 HortResearch and Crop and Food were merged in 2008 to form Plant & Food Research
 Department of Island Territories
 Department of Labour
 Department of Lands and Survey
 Land Transport New Zealand (merged into the NZ Transport Agency)
 Department of Industries and Commerce
 Marine Department
 Mines Department
 Transfund New Zealand (merged into Land Transport New Zealand)
 Traffic Safety Service (absorbed into New Zealand Police)
 New Zealand Post Office (corporatised in 1987 as New Zealand Post, PostBank and Telecom)
 State Hydro Department, became New Zealand Electricity Department, then NZE, then ECNZ
 New Zealand Railways Department (corporatised in 1981 as a state-owned enterprise, the New Zealand Railways Corporation, including the infrastructure, which is now trading as KiwiRail)
 Ministry of Research, Science and Technology (MoRST) (Te Manatū Pūtaiao)
 Ministry of Works (formerly the Department of Public Works)
 Department of Social Welfare (restructured in 1999)
 Income Support Service became Work and Income New Zealand (WINZ)
 Children, Young Persons and their Families Agency became Child Youth and Family Service
 the remainder of core services became part of the Ministry of Social Policy.
 New Zealand Wildlife Service (a division of Internal Affairs)
 Solid Energy New Zealand Limited (Went into administration and assets sold in 2015)
 Terralink NZ Limited

See also
 Centre for Strategic Studies New Zealand
 New Zealand Cabinet
 Institute of Public Administration New Zealand

References

External links
 Te Kawa Mataaho Public Service Commission list of organisations of the State sector
 State-Owned Enterprises Act 1986 at the www.legislation.govt.nz site (as consolidated and amended)
 Bilingual titles of public and private sector organisations at the Māori Language Commission Te Taura Whiri i te Reo Māori site

 
Lists of organisations based in New Zealand
New Zealand
Organisations